There are over 2500 listed buildings in Liverpool, England. A listed building is one considered to be of special architectural, historical or cultural significance, which is protected from being demolished, extended or altered, unless special permission is granted by the relevant planning authorities. Of the listed buildings in Liverpool, at least 85 are classified as Grade II* listed and are recognised as being particularly important with more than special architectural or historic interest. The following list provides information on all the Grade II* listed buildings located in all the L postcodes outside the city centre (i.e. excluding L1, L2 and L3).

Grade II* listed buildings in the suburbs of Liverpool

See also
Architecture of Liverpool

References
Notes

Citations

Sources

External links
 Liverpool City Council listed buildings information page

Buildings in Liverpool
Listed buildings in Liverpool
Liverpool-related lists